Courting Chaos is a 2014 film written and directed by New Zealand filmmaker Alan Clay. The film is adapted from his book Angels Can Fly, a Modern Clown User Guide. The story is about a Beverly Hills girl who falls for a Venice Beach street clown called Chaos and she must overcome her inhibitions and become a clown herself for the relationship to survive.

Courting Chaos won the Best Comedy Film award at its premiere at the Hollywood Reel Independent Film Festival in February 2014 and went on to win the Special Jury Award for Romantic Comedy from WorldFest-Houston International Film Festival, one of the top awards from the oldest independent film festival in the world, where Lead actor, Rachelle DiMaria, was also nominated for Best Actor. The film also received Awards of Merit for Best Director and Best Feature Film from the Accolade Competition.

Cast
Rachelle DiMaria as Ginger
Alastair Bayardo as Chaos
Nancy la Scala as Darlene
Jessica Howell as Madonna
Tristan Cunningham as Dancer
Jeff Bee as TC
Blake Young-Fountain as Jeff

Production

Courting Chaos is notable for being shot and having finished the complete post production process, with a live music score, in just six weeks. This was done to capture the spontaneity inherent in the film's subject matter and to achieve this, composer Sherri Chung was composing the film's performance tracks and score from the script prior to the shoot and editor Ranchel Ann Pearl was working on set at Venice Beach from the second day. 

A team of 7 camera operators under DP Dan Kneece captured the street theatre scenes live, complete with real audience interactions and performer perspective shots from cameras mounted on the clowns. By the end of the 4 week shoot there was a rough cut of the film. One week later it was a fine cut and by the end of the following week, music was recorded and sound mixed. The result is a delightfully light and intimate story about the lead character's journey of liberation as she allows the spontaneity of becoming a clown in her life.

Accolades
 Best Comedy Film award at the Hollywood Reel Independent Film Festival in February 2014.
 Special Jury Award for Romantic Comedy at Worldfest, Houston, 2014 where, Rachelle DiMaria, was also nominated for Best Actor.
 Awards of Merit for Best Director and Best Feature Film from the Accolade Awards, 2014.

Release
The film was released in the United States in 2014 to good reviews.

References

External links 
 

American comedy films
New Zealand comedy films
2014 films
2010s English-language films
2010s American films